Deep Bay is a bay near the south-western tip of Reindeer Lake in Saskatchewan, Canada. The bay is strikingly circular and very deep (220 m) in an otherwise irregular and shallow lake. It is the deepest body of water in Saskatchewan.

The bay was formed in a 13 km wide impact crater. The age of the crater is estimated to be 99 ± 4 million years (Cretaceous).

The smaller Gow crater, of Triassic age, is approximately 90 km west of Deep Bay crater.

References

External links
Aerial exploration of the Deep Bay crater

Impact craters of Saskatchewan
Cretaceous impact craters
Division No. 18, Saskatchewan